Mary Agnes Tincker (July 18, 1833 – December 4, 1907) was an American novelist. She published about a dozen novels and many short stories. She was made a member of the Ancient Academy of Arcadia of Rome, and of the American Academy of Political and Social Science, Philadelphia.

Life and works
Tincker was born in Ellsworth, Maine, daughter of Richard Tinker and Mehitable Jellison; descendant of Thomas Tinker, of the Mayflower, and of Benjamin Jellison, a Presbyterian, of Scots, Irish and English extraction, who was an extensive land-owner in Maine and Canada, but, having adhered to the Loyalist cause during the revolution, his estate was confiscated. He then settled on a grant of land in New Brunswick, where he began life anew. Mary Tincker's father was deputy sheriff and subsequently high sheriff of Hancock County, and at the time of his death was warden of the Maine state prison.  She was educated at the high-school in Ellsworth, and at the academy in Blue Hill, Maine.  At the age of thirteen she began teaching in the public schools. At fifteen her first literary work was printed.  Her father was a prosperous Congregational farmer but his daughter was so shocked by an incident in which a Roman Catholic priest was tarred-and-feathered by a mob of Know-Nothing agitators, that she converted to Roman Catholicism in protest at the age of twenty.

Civil War

In 1863, she procured a recommendation from Governor John A. Andrew of Massachusetts as a volunteer nurse for the wounded of the Civil War, and served in ward 6, Judiciary Square Hospital, at Washington, D. C., until she herself fell ill. On her recovery, making her residence in Boston, she was there wholly engrossed in journalistic and literary work. Short stories from her pen appeared in the early numbers of The Catholic World. During this period she wrote her earliest novels, "The House of Yorke" and " Grapes and Thorns," both of which were in the fourth edition in 1872, and "A Winged World, and other Sketches" (1873).

Europe

In 1873 she went to Europe, where she remained fourteen years visiting France, England and Spain. She resided in Italy many years, and immersed herself in the language and customs. She had many expatriate American friends, whom she used as inspiration in some of her novels, a practice of which they did not always approve.   Much time was spent in Assisi and Palestrina. It was followed by Grapes and Thorns (1873–74) and Six Sunny Months (1876–77). The latter was the first fruit of her sojourn in Italy (1873–1887).

Rise to prominence

"Six Sunny Months" was written in Italy in 1878, and " Signor Monaldini's Niece " in 1879.  The latter was published both in England and America, and immediately called forth such universal approbation from the critics and the reading world that she found herself famous overnight.  By the Tiber (1881), 
The Jewel in the Lotus (1884); Aurora (1885), were all written at this time and won her great fame. The Catholic World, trying to downplay the scandalous reception of some of her books from this time, wrote, "They reflected, for the most part, the beauty of Italy."

The Two Coronets (1887); and San Salvador (1889), were written after she returned to America and also sold well.

Translations

Her Grapes and Thorns was translated into French by the Marchioness of San Carlos de Pedroso,  By the Tiber into German by Baroness Butler, and Two Coronets, by Heusel.

Last book

Her last book, fittingly called Autumn Leaves, was issued in 1898, and contained matter contributed not long before to The Catholic World. Tincker died in Boston.

Bibliography
The House of Yorke (1872)
A Winged Word (1873), and other sketches and stories, The Catholic Publication Society 
Grapes and Thorns; or, A Priest's Sacrifice (1874)
By the Tiber (1881) Roberts Bros.
The Jewel in the Lotos (1884) J.B. Lippincott & Co. 
San Salvador (1878)
 Signor Monaldini's Niece (1879) 
Two Coronets (1889) Houghton, Mifflin & Company 
Aurora (1890)
The Life Beyond (1892), adapted from the work of Margaret Gatty
Autumn leaves (1899)

Short stories

 "Sister Sylvia" (1900) in Stories by American Authors, Scribner & Sons  (short story)
 "From the Garden of a Friend"
 "Six Sunny Months, And Other Stories" (1878)

Notes

References

1833 births
1907 deaths
19th-century American novelists
American women novelists
Novelists from Maine
People from Ellsworth, Maine
19th-century American women writers